This article serves as an index - as complete as possible - of all the honorific orders or similar decorations received by the Swedish Royal Family, classified by continent, awarding country and recipient.

Swedish honours 

 Carl XVI Gustaf of Sweden :
 Lord and Master (and Knight with Collar) of the Order of the Seraphim
 Lord and Master (and Commander Grand Cross) of the Order of the Sword
 Lord and Master (and Commander Grand Cross) of the Order of the Polar Star
 Lord and Master (and Commander Grand Cross) of the Order of Vasa
 Lord and Master (and Knight) of the Order of Charles XIII
 Queen Silvia of Sweden : Member of the Order of the Seraphim
 Victoria, Crown Princess of Sweden : Member with Collar of the Royal Order of the Seraphim (14 July 1995)
 Prince Daniel, Duke of Västergötland : 
 Knight of the Royal Order of the Seraphim (19 June 2010)
 Commander of the Royal Order of the Polar Star (KNO)
 Princess Estelle, Duchess of Östergötland : Knight of the Royal Order of the Seraphim (Christening, 22 May 2012)
 Prince Oscar, Duke of Skåne :
 Knight of the Order of Charles XIII (since birth, 2 March 2016)
 Knight of the Royal Order of the Seraphim (Christening, 27 May 2016)
 Prince Carl Philip, Duke of Värmland :
 Knight of the Order of Charles XIII (since birth, 13 May 1979)
 Knight with Collar of the Royal Order of the Seraphim (13 May 1997)
 Commander of the Royal Order of the Polar Star (KNO)
 Princess Sofia, Duchess of Värmland : Member of the Order of the Seraphim (2015)
 Prince Alexander, Duke of Södermanland :
 Knight of the Order of Charles XIII (since birth, 19 April 2016)
 Knight of the Order of the Seraphim (Christening, 9 September 2016)
 Princess Madeleine, Duchess of Hälsingland and Gästrikland : Member of the Order of the Seraphim
 Christopher O'Neill : Commander of the Order of the Polar Star (KNO, 6 June 2013)
 Princess Leonore, Duchess of Gotland : Member of the Order of the Seraphim (Christening, 8 June 2014)
 Prince Nicolas, Duke of Ångermanland : 
 Knight of the Order of Charles XIII (since birth, 15 June 2015)
 Knight of the Order of the Seraphim (Christening, 11 October 2015)
 Princess Margaretha, Mrs. Ambler : Member of the Order of the Seraphim
 Princess Birgitta, Princess of Hohenzollern : Member of the Order of the Seraphim
 Princess Désirée, Baroness Silfverschiöld : Member of the Order of the Seraphim
 Princess Christina, Mrs. Magnuson : Member of the Order of the Seraphim
 Recipient of the Kings Medal, Special Class with diamonds

European foreign honours

Austria 

 Carl XVI Gustaf of Sweden : Grand Star of the Decoration of Honour for Services to the Republic of Austria
 Queen Silvia of Sweden : Grand Star of the Decoration of Honour for Services to the Republic of Austria
 Victoria, Crown Princess of Sweden : Grand Decoration of Honour in Gold with Sash for Services to the Republic of Austria

Belgium 

 Carl XVI Gustaf of Sweden : Grand Cordon of the Order of Leopold (1977)
 Queen Silvia of Sweden : Grand Cordon of the Order of Leopold (1977)
 Victoria, Crown Princess of Sweden : Grand Cordon of the Order of Leopold (2001)

Bulgaria 

 Carl XVI Gustaf of Sweden : Grand Cross of the Order of Stara Planina
 Queen Silvia of Sweden : Grand Cross of the Order of Stara Planina
 Victoria, Crown Princess of Sweden : Grand Cross of the Order of Stara Planina
 Prince Carl Philip, Duke of Värmland : 1st Class of the Order of Stara Planina
 Princess Madeleine, Duchess of Hälsingland and Gästrikland : 1st Class of the Order of Stara Planina

Croatia 

 Carl XVI Gustaf of Sweden : Grand Cross of the Grand Order of King Tomislav
 Queen Silvia of Sweden : Grand Cross of the Grand Order of Queen Jelena

Denmark 

 Carl XVI Gustaf of Sweden :
 Knight with Collar of the Order of the Elephant (12.1.1965) - Grand Commander of the Order of the Dannebrog (10.4.1975)
 Queen Silvia of Sweden : Knight with Collar of the Order of the Elephant (3.9.1985)
 Victoria, Crown Princess of Sweden : Knight of the Order of the Elephant (14.7.1995)
 Princess Christina, Mrs. Magnuson : Knight of the Order of the Elephant (17.1.1973)

Estonia 

They have been awarded :

 Carl XVI Gustaf of Sweden :
 Collar of the Order of the Cross of Terra Mariana (11/09/1995) - Collar of the Order of the White Star (18/01/2011)
 Queen Silvia of Sweden :
 Order of the Cross of Terra Mariana, First Class (11/09/1995) - Order of the White Star, First Class (18/01/2011)
 Victoria, Crown Princess of Sweden :
 Order of the Cross of Terra Mariana, First Class (11/09/1995) - Order of the White Star, First Class (18/01/2011)
 Prince Daniel, Duke of Västergötland : Order of the Cross of Terra Mariana, 1st class (18/01/2011)
 Prince Carl Philip, Duke of Värmland : Order of the Cross of Terra Mariana, First Class (18/01/2011)

Finland 

 Carl XVI Gustaf of Sweden : Grand Cross with Collar of the Order of the White Rose
 Queen Silvia of Sweden : Grand Cross with Collar of the Order of the White Rose
 Victoria, Crown Princess of Sweden : Grand Cross with Collar of the Order of the White Rose (1996)-(2022)
 Prince Daniel, Duke of Västergötland : Grand Cross of the Order of the White Rose of Finland (17 April 2012)
 Prince Carl Philip, Duke of Värmland : Grand Cross of the Order of the White Rose of Finland (17 April 2012)
 Princess Sofia, Duchess of Värmland: Grand Cross of the Order of the White Rose of Finland (17 May 2022)

France 

 Carl XVI Gustaf of Sweden : Grand Cross of the Legion of Honour
 Queen Silvia of Sweden : Grand Cross of the National Order of Merit
 Grand Cross of the Legion of Honour
 Victoria, Crown Princess of Sweden : Grand Cross of the National Order of Merit
 Princess Christina, Mrs. Magnuson : Commander of the Legion of Honour (15/07/2004)

Germany 

 Carl XVI Gustaf of Sweden : Grand Cross Special Class of the Order of Merit of the Federal Republic of Germany
  House of Saxe-Coburg and Gotha : Grand Cross of the Saxe-Ernestine House Order
 Queen Silvia of Sweden : Grand Cross Special Class of the Order of Merit of the Federal Republic of Germany
 : Recipient of the Order of Merit of Baden-Württemberg
 : Dame of the Bavarian Order of Merit 
 Victoria, Crown Princess of Sweden : Grand Cross 1st Class of the Order of Merit of the Federal Republic of Germany
 Prince Daniel, Duke of Västergötland: Grand Cross 1st Class of the Order of Merit of the Federal Republic of Germany
 Prince Carl Philip, Duke of Värmland : Grand Cross 1st Class of the Order of Merit of the Federal Republic of Germany
 Princess Sofia, Duchess of Värmland: Grand Cross 1st Class of the Order of Merit of the Federal Republic of Germany
 Princess Madeleine, Duchess of Hälsingland and Gästrikland : Grand Cross 1st Class of the Order of Merit of the Federal Republic of Germany
 Princess Christina, Mrs. Magnuson: Grand Cross 1st Class of the Order of Merit of the Federal Republic of Germany

Greece 

 Carl XVI Gustaf of Sweden : Grand Cross of the Order of the Redeemer
 Queen Silvia of Sweden : Grand Cross of the Order of Honour (21/05/2008)
 Victoria, Crown Princess of Sweden : Grand Cross of the Order of Honour (21/05/2008)
 Prince Carl Philip, Duke of Värmland : Grand Cross of the Order of Honour (21/05/2008)

Holy See

 Carl XVI Gustaf of Sweden : Knight  with the Collar of the Order of Pope Pius IX
 Queen Silvia of Sweden : Recipient of the Benemerenti Medal

Hungary
 Carl XVI Gustaf of Sweden : Grand Cross of the Order of Merit of the Republic of Hungary
 Queen Silvia of Sweden : Grand Cross of the Order of Merit of the Republic of Hungary

Iceland 

 Carl XVI Gustaf of Sweden : Grand Cross with Collar of the Order of the Falcon (10/06/1975)
 Queen Silvia of Sweden : Knight Grand Cross of the Order of the Falcon (26/10/1981)
 Victoria, Crown Princess of Sweden : Knight Grand Cross of the Order of the Falcon (07/09/2004)
 Prince Daniel, Duke of Västergötland: Knight Grand Cross of the Order of the Falcon (17/01/2018)
 Prince Carl Philip, Duke of Värmland: Knight Grand Cross of the Order of the Falcon (17/01/2018)
 Princess Sofia, Duchess of Värmland: Dame Grand Cross of the Order of the Falcon (17/01/2018)
 Princess Christina, Mrs. Magnuson : Knight Grand Cross of the Order of the Falcon (24/12/1998)

Italy 

 Carl XVI Gustaf of Sweden : Knight Grand Cross with Collar of the Order of Merit of the Italian Republic (08/04/1991)
 Queen Silvia of Sweden : Knight Grand Cross of the Order of Merit of the Italian Republic (08/04/1991)
 Victoria, Crown Princess of Sweden : Knight Grand Cross of the Order of Merit of the Italian Republic (02/11/2018)
 Prince Daniel, Duke of Västergötland: Knight Grand Cross of the Order of Merit of the Italian Republic (02/11/2018)
 Prince Carl Philip, Duke of Värmland: Knight Grand Cross of the Order of Merit of the Italian Republic (02/11/2018)
 Princess Sofia, Duchess of Värmland: Knight Grand Cross of the Order of Merit of the Italian Republic (02/11/2018)
 Princess Christina, Mrs. Magnuson: Knight Grand Cross of the Order of Merit of the Italian Republic (05/05/1998)

Latvia 

 Carl XVI Gustaf of Sweden : Commander Grand Cross with Chain of the Order of Three Stars (1995)
 Grand Cross of the Order of Viesturs (2014)
 Queen Silvia of Sweden : Commander Grand Cross of the Order of Three Stars (1995)
 Grand Cross of the Cross of Recognition (2014)
 Victoria, Crown Princess of Sweden : Grand Officer of the Order of the Three Stars (2005)
 Prince Carl Philip, Duke of Värmland : Grand Officer of the Order of the Three Stars (2005)
 Princess Madeleine, Duchess of Hälsingland and Gästrikland : Grand Officer of the Order of the Three Stars (2005)

Lithuania 

 Carl XVI Gustaf of Sweden : Grand Cross of the Order of Vytautas the Great (21/11/1995) with  Golden Chain (2015)
 Queen Silvia of Sweden : 
 Grand Cross of the Order of Vytautas the Great (21/11/1995)
 Grand Cross of the Order for Merits to Lithuania (2015)
 Victoria, Crown Princess of Sweden : Commander's Grand Cross of the Order of the Lithuanian Grand Duke Gediminas (21/11/1995)

Luxembourg 

 Carl XVI Gustaf of Sweden : Knight of the Order of the Gold Lion of the House of Nassau
 Queen Silvia of Sweden : Knight of the Order of the Gold Lion of the House of Nassau
 Victoria, Crown Princess of Sweden : Grand Cross of the Order of Adolphe of Nassau
 Prince Carl Philip, Duke of Värmland : Grand Cross of the Order of Adolphe of Nassau (04/2008)
 Princess Madeleine, Duchess of Hälsingland and Gästrikland : Grand Cross of the Order of Adolphe of Nassau (04/2008)
 Tord Magnuson: Grand Officer of the Order of Adolphe of Nassau

Monaco 
 Victoria, Crown Princess of Sweden : Knight of the Order of Grimaldi (2005)

Netherlands 

 Carl XVI Gustaf of Sweden : Grand Cross of the Order of the Netherlands Lion & of the Order of the House of Orange
 Knight Commander of the Order of the Golden Ark, 1st Class
 Queen Silvia of Sweden : Grand Cross of the Order of the Netherlands Lion
 Victoria, Crown Princess of Sweden : Grand Cross of the Order of the Netherlands Lion (11/10/2022) 
 Prince Daniel, Duke  of Västergötland : Grand Cross of the Order of the Crown (11/10/2022) 
 Prince Carl Philip, Duke of Värmland : Grand Cross of the Order of the Crown (11/10/2022) 
 Princess Sofia, Duchess of Värmland : Grand Cross of the Order of the Crown (11/10/2022) 
 Princess Christina, Mrs. Magnuson : Grand Cross of the Order of the Crown (11/10/2022)
 Tord Magnuson : Grand Honorary Cross with Star of the Order of the Crown (11/10/2022)

Norway 

 Carl XVI Gustaf of Sweden : Grand Cross with collar of the Royal Norwegian Order of St. Olav (1974)
 Queen Silvia of Sweden : Grand Cross of the Royal Norwegian Order of St. Olav (1982)
 Victoria, Crown Princess of Sweden : Grand Cross of the Royal Norwegian Order of St. Olav (1995)
 Prince Daniel, Duke  of Västergötland : Grand Cross of the Royal Norwegian Order of St. Olav (17/06/2022)
 Prince Carl Philip, Duke of Värmland : Grand Cross of the Royal Norwegian Order of St. Olav (01/09/2005)
 Princess Madeleine, Duchess of Hälsingland and Gästrikland : Grand Cross of the Royal Norwegian Order of Saint Olav (01/09/2005)
 Princess Désirée, Baroness Silfverschiöld : Grand Cross of the Royal Norwegian Order of Saint Olav (1992)
 Princess Christina, Mrs. Magnuson : Grand Cross of the Royal Norwegian Order of Saint Olav (1992)

Poland 

 Carl XVI Gustaf of Sweden : Grand Cross of the Order of the White Eagle
 Queen Silvia of Sweden : Grand Cross of the Order of the White Eagle

Portugal 

 Carl XVI Gustaf of Sweden : Grand Collar of the Order of Prince Henry (13 January 1987) & of the Order of Saint James of the Sword (2 May 2008)
 Queen Silvia of Sweden : Grand Cross of the Order of Christ (13 January 1987) & of the Order of Prince Henry (2 May 2008)
 Princess Christina, Mrs. Magnuson : Grand Cross of the Order of Christ (15 May 1991)

Romania

 Carl XVI Gustaf of Sweden : Collar of the Order of the Star of Romania (2003)
 Queen Silvia of Sweden : Grand Cross of the Order of the Star of Romania (2008)
 Victoria, Crown Princess of Sweden : Grand Cross of the Order of the Star of Romania (2008)
 Prince Carl Philip, Duke of Värmland : Grand Cross of the Order of Faithful Service (2008)
 Princess Madeleine, Duchess of Hälsingland and Gästrikland : Grand Cross of the Order of Faithful Service (2008)

Slovakia 

 Carl XVI Gustaf of Sweden : Grand Cross (or 1st Class) of the Order of the White Double Cross (2002)

Spain 

 Carl XVI Gustaf of Sweden : 
 Knight of the Order of the Golden Fleece (1,183rd member, 22/03/1983) 
 Collar of the Order of Charles III (15/10/1979)
 Queen Silvia of Sweden : 
Grand Cross of the Order of Isabella the Catholic (15/10/1979)
Dame Grand Cross of the Order of Charles III (16/11/2021)
 Victoria, Crown Princess of Sweden : Dame Grand Cross of the Order of Isabella the Catholic (16/11/2021)
 Prince Daniel, Duke of Västergötland: Knight Grand Cross of the Order of Civil Merit (16/11/2021)
 Prince Carl Philip, Duke of Värmland: Knight Grand Cross of the Order of Civil Merit (16/11/2021)
 Princess Sofia, Duchess of Värmland: Dame Grand Cross of the Order of Civil Merit (16/11/2021)

Turkey 

 Carl XVI Gustaf of Sweden : First Class of the Order of the State of Republic of Turkey (11 March 2013)

Ukraine 

 Carl XVI Gustaf of Sweden : Member of the Order of Liberty - The First Class of the Order of Prince Yaroslav the Wise
 Queen Silvia of Sweden : The First Class of the Order of Prince Yaroslav the Wise

United Kingdom 

 Carl XVI Gustaf of Sweden : Recipient of the Royal Victorian Chain (1975); Stranger Knight of the Order of the Garter (963rd member, 1983)

American foreign honours

Argentina 

 Carl XVI Gustaf of Sweden: Grand Cross with Collar of the Order of the Liberator General San Martín (1998).
 Queen Silvia of Sweden: Grand Cross of the Order of the Liberator General San Martín (1998)

Brazil 

 Carl XVI Gustaf of Sweden : Grand Collar of the Order of the Southern Cross
 Queen Silvia of Sweden : Grand Cross of the Order of the Southern Cross
 Victoria, Crown Princess of Sweden : Grand Cross of the Order of the Southern Cross (2007)
 Prince Carl Philip, Duke of Värmland : Grand Cross of the Order of Rio Branco (2007)
 Princess Madeleine, Duchess of Hälsingland and Gästrikland : Grand Cross of the Order of Rio Branco (2007)

Chile

 Carl XVI Gustaf of Sweden : Collar of the Order of Merit
 Queen Silvia of Sweden : Grand Cross of the Order of Bernardo O'Higgins
 Victoria, Crown Princess of Sweden : Grand Cross of the Order of Merit
 Prince Daniel, Duke of Västergötland : Grand Cross of the Order of Bernardo O'Higgins
 Prince Carl Philip, Duke of Värmland : Grand Cross of the Order of Merit

Mexico 

 Carl XVI Gustaf of Sweden : Collar of the Order of the Aztec Eagle
 Silvia of Sweden : Grand Cross of the Order of the Aztec Eagle

African foreign honours

South Africa 

 Carl XVI Gustaf of Sweden : Grand Cross of the Order of Good Hope (1997)

Tunisia 

 Carl XVI Gustaf of Sweden : Grand Cordon of the Order of the Republic
 Queen Silvia of Sweden : Grand Cross of the Order of Merit
 Victoria, Crown Princess of Sweden : Grand Officer of the Order of the Republic
 Prince Daniel, Duke of Västergötland : Grand Officer of the Order of Merit
 Prince Carl Philip, Duke of Värmland : Grand Officer of the Order of Merit

Asian foreign honours

Middle East

Jordan 

 Carl XVI Gustaf of Sweden : Collar of the Order of al-Hussein bin Ali (1989)
 Queen Silvia of Sweden : Grand Cordon of the Supreme Order of the Renaissance (1989)
 Victoria, Crown Princess of Sweden : Grand Cordon of the Supreme Order of the Renaissance (2003)
 Prince Carl Philip, Duke of Värmland: Grand Cordon of the Order of the Star of Jordan (2003)
 Princess Madeleine, Duchess of Hälsingland and Gästrikland : Grand Cordon of the Order of the Star of Jordan

Far East

Japan 

 Carl XVI Gustaf of Sweden : 
 Collar of the Order of the Chrysanthemum
 Golden Pheasant Award (1980)
 Queen Silvia of Sweden : Grand Cordon of the Order of the Precious Crown
 Victoria, Crown Princess of Sweden : Grand Cordon of the Order of the Chrysanthemum
 Princess Désirée, Baroness Silfverschiöld : Grand Cordon of the Order of the Precious Crown (2000)
 Princess Christina, Mrs. Magnuson : Grand Cordon of the Order of the Precious Crown (2000)

Malaysia 

 Carl XVI Gustaf of Sweden : Honorary Recipient of the Order of the Crown of the Realm (D.M.N., 12 March 1996)
 Queen Silvia of Sweden : Honorary Recipient of the Order of the Crown of the Realm (D.M.N., 14 September 2005)
 Victoria, Crown Princess of Sweden : Honorary Grand Commander of the Order of the Defender of the Realm (S.M.N., 14 September 2005)
 Prince Carl Philip, Duke of Värmland : Honorary Commander of the Order of Loyalty to the Crown of Malaysia (P.S.M., 14 September 2005)
 Princess Madeleine, Duchess of Hälsingland and Gästrikland : Honorary Commander of the Order of Loyalty to the Crown of Malaysia (P.S.M., 14 September 2005)

South Korea 

 Carl XVI Gustaf of Sweden : Recipient of the Grand Order of Mugunghwa (2012)
 Queen Silvia of Sweden : Grand Gwanghwa Medal of the Order of Diplomatic Service Merit (2012)
 Victoria, Crown Princess of Sweden : Grand Gwanghwa Medal of the Order of Diplomatic Service Merit (2019)
 Prince Daniel, Duke of Västergötland : Grand Gwanghwa Medal of the Order of Diplomatic Service Merit (2019)

Thailand 

 Carl XVI Gustaf of Sweden : Knight of the Order of the Rajamitrabhorn 
 Queen Silvia of Sweden : Dame Grand Cross (First Class) of the Order of Chula Chom Klao

References

Sweden